Guowu Jiyao Fei Case, translated as state secret affairs expenses case, is a government scandal that happened in 2006 in Taiwan, involving President Chen Shui Bian and a family member. On 2 November 2006, the Supreme Prosecutors Office of the Supreme Court announced its investigation was over and sued, but Article 52 of the Constitution of the Republic of China's gives the president of Taiwan immunity, so he could not be prosecuted until he left office. It was reported in the media of various countries because it involved the national leader.

References

Political scandals in Taiwan